Lo imperdonable (English: Unforgivable) is a Mexican telenovela produced by Salvador Mejía Alejandre for Televisa. Based on the telenovela La mentira (1998).

Ana Brenda Contreras and Iván Sánchez star as the protagonists, with Sebastián Zurita, Gaby Mellado, Claudia Ramírez and Sergio Sendel star as the co-protagonists, while Grettell Valdéz, Juan Ángel Esparza and Guillermo García Cantú star as the antagonists.

Plot
Martín San Telmo comes to a small, remote town called Mina Escondida where his wanted half-brother, Demetrio, lives and works in a gold mine; upon arrival, Martín discovers that Demetrio has committed suicide after being betrayed by a heartless and ambitious woman who only played with his emotions. Little by little, and thanks to the help of the inhabitants (which initially were hostile to him but later became his friends), Martin manages to determine what led Demetrio to commit suicide so tragically.

Martin's investigation leads him to Mexico City, to a millionaires' mansion, of the Prado Castelo family, who own one of the most important jewelry companies in the country. According to information that Martin has managed to discover, the woman for whom Demetrio took his life is living in that house and her name begins with the letter V. He knows this because she had left Demetrio a necklace with the initial V and the Prado Castelo surname recorded in it.

Martin meets two young women there, Verónica and Virginia Prado Castelo, both nieces of the family: innocent and fragile Virginia and Verónica, who is strong and courageous. Without knowing which is the guilty one, Martin concludes, after a series of coincidences and rumours, that the woman who he seeks is Veronica. Thus, begins his revenge plan: first to flirt with Verónica, seduce her and make her fall in love with him, and finally marry her.

After the wedding, Martin almost kidnaps her and takes her to Mina Escondida where Demetrio committed suicide, determined to make her life miserable and take revenge for the suicide of his brother.

Little does he know, like Verónica, they are actually victims of Virginia Padro Castelo, an evil and ambitious woman whose angelic face hides a wicked spirit. The purpose of Virginia's marriage to Emiliano, her cousin, the only son of Jorge and Salma Prado Castelo, is to change her status and become Mrs. Prado Castelo by double-entry and thus gain all the wealth of the family.

When Martin discovers the truth, everything will seem lost as Verónica abandons him because of his distrust and will be left looking the fool for believing people who only have bad intentions. For this reason, Martin will have to fight very hard to regain the love of his life.

Cast
Cast was confirmed on April 17, 2015.

Main cast 
Ana Brenda Contreras as Verónica Prado Castelo
Iván Sánchez as Martín San Telmo
Sergio Sendel as Emiliano Prado Castelo
Grettell Valdéz as Virginia Prado Castelo
Juan Ferrara as Jorge Prado Castelo
Claudia Ramírez as Magdalena Castilla de Botel
Guillermo Capetillo as Padre Juan
Alicia Machado  as Claudia Ordaz
Gaby Mellado as Ana Perla Sánchez
Sebastián Zurita as Pablo Hidalgo
Guillermo García Cantú as Aarón Martínez

Supporting cast 
Marcelo Buquet as Aquiles Botel
Mar Contreras as Nanciyaga
Juan Ángel Esparza as Manuel Sánchez Álvarez
Paty Díaz as Raymunda Álvarez
Gabriela Goldsmith as Montserrat
Roberto Ballesteros as Joaquín Arroyo
Jackie Sauza as Mariana
Delia Casanova as Matilde
Michel Duval as Teo
Camil Hazouri as Polo
Ricardo Franco as Julio
Elsa Cárdenas as Jovita
Patsy as Salma Prado Castelo
Salvador Sánchez as Crescencio Álvarez
Osvaldo de León as Dr. Daniel 
Pablo Montero as Demetrio Silveria
Gonzalo Vivanco as Pierre Dussage
Raúl Magaña as Alfredo
Tania Lizardo as Blanca Arroyo Álvarez "Blanquita"
Danna García as Rebeca Rojo
Diego Olivera as Jerónimo

Mexico broadcast 
As of April 20, 2015, Canal de las Estrellas is broadcasting Lo imperdonable weeknights at 9:25pm, replacing Hasta el fin del mundo. Univision aired Lo imperdonable in the United States on May 18, 2015 weeknights at 9pm/8c replacing Hasta el fin del mundo. The last episode was broadcast on November 2, 2015 with Pasión y poder replacing it the next day.

Soundtrack 
List of confirmed songs.

References

External links

Mexican telenovelas
Televisa telenovelas
Spanish-language telenovelas
2015 Mexican television series debuts
2015 telenovelas
2015 Mexican television series endings